Neolamprologus petricola is a species of cichlid endemic to Lake Tanganyika where it is only known from the shores of the Democratic Republic of the Congo.  This species reaches a length of  TL.  It can also be found in the aquarium trade.

References

petricola
Fish of the Democratic Republic of the Congo
Fish of Lake Tanganyika
Taxa named by Max Poll
Fish described in 1949
Taxonomy articles created by Polbot